Bijli Nangal  is a village in Kapurthala district of Punjab State, India. The village is administrated by a Sarpanch, who is an elected representative.

Demography 
According to the report published by Census India in 2011, Bijli Nangal has a total number of 89 houses and population of 478 of which include 252 males and 226 females. Literacy rate of Bijli Nangal is   57.21%, lower than state average of 75.84%.  The population of children under the age of 6 years is 76 which is 15.90% of total population of Bijli Nangal, and child sex ratio is approximately  1111, higher than state average of 846.

Air travel connectivity 
The closest airport to the village is Sri Guru Ram Dass Jee International Airport.

Villages in Kapurthala

External links
  Villages in Kapurthala
 Kapurthala Villages List

References

Villages in Kapurthala district